Imma hectaea is a moth in the family Immidae. It was described by Edward Meyrick in 1906. It is found on Borneo.

The wingspan is about 17 mm. The forewings are blackish with a moderate ochreous-yellow streak from the base below the middle of the disc to two-fifths and a slightly curved ochreous-yellow fascia from the middle of the costa, broadest on the costa and at three-fourths, constricted above the middle, not quite reaching the dorsum at two-thirds. The hindwings are dark fuscous, with thinly scaled lighter elongate patches along the dorsum and in the anterior portion of the disc.

References

Moths described in 1906
Immidae
Moths of Asia